The Northern Rhodesia Police was the police force of the British-ruled protectorate of Northern Rhodesia (now Zambia).

History
In 1889 Northern Rhodesia, bounded by Angola (Portuguese West Africa), the Belgian Congo, German East Africa, British Central Africa (Nyasaland now Malawi), Mozambique (Portuguese East Africa), Mashonaland and Matabeleland (Southern Rhodesia now Zimbabwe), Bechuanaland (Botswana) and the Caprivi strip of German South West Africa (Namibia), was not a political unit and had no name at all. Customary law was administered among the 70 odd tribes which populated the Territory by their chiefs. Some chiefs were, willingly or not, in league with the Arab and Portuguese slavers who preyed on the population.

In October 1889 Cecil Rhodes obtained a Royal Charter for the British South Africa Company to, inter alia, make treaties, promulgate laws, preserve the peace, and maintain a police force in what was to become the Rhodesias. Harry Johnston, Imperial Commissioner in Nyasaland was additionally appointed as Administrator for the company's territory north of the Zambezi.

Over the next ten years small posts each under a white 'collector' were established throughout North-Eastern Rhodesia, in the area north and east of the Kafue River. Each had at his disposal a handful of armed African police. With these, and on two occasions with African troops from Nyasaland, the collectors drove out the slavers and established the company's administration. On 1 July 1895 Major Patrick Forbes, of the British South Africa Company's service, was appointed Deputy Administrator responsible for North-Eastern Rhodesia. His escort, Sergeant Drysdale, and four troopers, had been recruited from the company's police in Southern Rhodesia and attested as North-Eastern Rhodesia Police. They were dispersed to various posts to assist or take over from the local collector.

The North-Eastern Rhodesia Order in Council of January 1900 formalised the territory's constitution. Previously jurisdiction had been exercised by Consular Courts under the African Order in Council of 1889. Now a High Court was established administering English law and district magistrates were to be appointed. In 1901 Judge Leicester Beaufort arrived at the capital, Fort Jameson (now Chipata). There were five magistrates and thirty-one Native Commissioners, no longer called Collectors, probably because collection of an annual Hut Tax of three shillings began that year. The police, about 200 in all, were still recruited by each local official at his own station. Their duties were:
 To guard the property of the government.
 To act as escorts to caravans.
 To carry messages from the administrative officials to native chiefs.
 To effect any arrests of natives that may be required.
 To guard native prisons.

In 1903 Captain Richard Bright, a regular officer of the British Army was appointed Commandant to organise and constitute the North-Eastern Rhodesia Constabulary as the police were to be known. He issued instructions that:
 Native constables were only to make arrests on warrant or when an offence was committed in their presence.
 They were to seek assistance from the local headman when effecting an arrest or serving a summons.
 They were not to carry arms except when accompanied by a European official or when necessary for protection from wild animals.
Recruits were now trained centrally at Fort Jameson.

To the west in Barotseland the company was slow off the mark. Lewanika, the Litunga of Barotseland claimed suzerainty over all tribes between the Zambezi and the Kafue and beyond, and westward into Angola. He was anxious for British protection fearing the Matabele to the south, the Portuguese and the Belgians. He signed the Lochner Concession in 1890, but it was not until 1897 that Robert Coryndon arrived at his capital Lealui with five white British South Africa Police as living proof of Queen Victoria's protection.

In April 1898 Sub-Inspector Cazalet of the BSAP led a patrol along the north bank as well as south of the Zambezi to put a stop to reported dealing in firearms, cattle stealing and other lawbreaking by Europeans. In September 1898 Captain Drury came up from Bulawayo with 13 troopers and built a fort at Monze some miles form the present township. The purpose was to protect European traders and prospectors coming up from the South and prevent inter-tribal fighting. Offenders were fined in cattle without recourse to a court.

Cecil Rhodes was always of the view that the police force north of the Zambezi should be African. Europeans were expensive and their numbers were continually thinned by blackwater fever and other diseases. Major Colin Harding  formerly commander of the Mashonaland Native Police relieved Coryndon as Resident Commissioner in late 1899 at about the time the Barotseland/North-Western Rhodesia Order in Council was issued. On Coryndon's return from leave, now as Administrator of the new territory, Harding was appointed commandant of the Barotse Native Police, recruiting and training for which, he had already put in hand in between extensive patrols up the Zambezi and into Angola to ascertain the true limits of Lewanika's sphere of influence.

Harding oversaw the departure of the remnants of the BSAP from Monze and patrolled along the Zambezi and Kafue until he was familiar with the whole territory. In 1901 a fort was built at Kasempa from which patrols went out after slavers. By 1902 the Barotse Native Police comprised nine European officers and NCOs, and 240 native police.

In May 1904 Edward Davies, foreman at a quarry near Kalomo, the administrative headquarters of the territory, got drunk and fired at African workers, mortally wounding one. Davies was still drunk when arrested by RSM Toulson and Sergeant Lethbridge. On 8 July Davies was convicted of manslaughter and sentenced to two years imprisonment having pleaded self-defence. For such cases a Judge came up from Southern Rhodesia, but North-Western Rhodesia had its own magistrate, Harry Rangely, who held court at Kalomo and at the Old Drift near Victoria Falls.

In April 1904 the railway reached Victoria Falls and a year later the Falls Bridge was completed over the Zambezi. The Old Drift became redundant as the landing place for imports. The settlers there moved up to the new township of Livingstone. Constable Foley became Gaoler, Magistrates Clerk and Sanitary Superintendent at Livingstone with Sergeant Burdett responsible for police work at the Falls and Process serving throughout the Territory. In September 1905 Constable Cathcart arrived at Kalomo for civil police duties, to act as Magistrate's Clerk and superintend sanitation. These three were members of the North-Western Rhodesia Constabulary under the Judicial Department and not part of the Barotse Native Police which was a military force responsible for internal security and to deal with incursions by slavers and hostile tribes from across the borders.

The collection of hut tax commenced in 1904. The Barotse Native Police were called upon to support civil officials in its collection.  Harding fell out with the Administration by raising with the High Commissioner in South Africa the question of hut burning to encourage payment. Harding resigned in 1906 and his Second-in-command, Major Carden became Commandant.

In the year ending 12 July 1907 thirty-one Whites, three Asians and eighty-eight Africans appeared before the Magistrate at Livingstone, Kafue and Kalomo.  A gaol had been built at Livingstone to accommodate four Europeans and twenty Africans. The magistrate at Kasempa only had to try four cases, all of witchcraft. Africans from Nyasaland and the west coast of Africa were blamed for thefts in towns and there was said to be a rough White element which required constant supervision. The headquarters of the Government and Barotse Native Police moved to Livingstone and the Barotse Native Police were absorbed into the Constabulary.

By 1910 the railway was complete through to the Congo. Mining was in operation at Broken Hill (Kabwe) and Kansanshi, but the far North-West was troublesome. In the Kasempa District three Africans shot a prospector in the back through the window of his house. The murderers fled into the virtual no-man's-land on the border of Mozambique. The offer of a £20 reward led to their location. One of the accused confessed to the previous murder of an African. All three were tried and hanged. Two chiefs were sentenced to imprisonment for failing to give information.

By an Order in Council of 4 May 1911 Barotseland, North-Western Rhodesia and North-Eastern Rhodesia were amalgamated as one territory, Northern Rhodesia, still administered by the British South Africa Company. Consequently, the North-Eastern Rhodesia Constabulary and the Barotse Native Police were amalgamated as the Northern Rhodesia Police. Major F. A. Hodson, the original Adjutant of the Barotse Native Police, soon succeeded Lieutenant Colonel Carden as Commandant of the new force.

In 1913 Colonel Edwards, a regular cavalry officer who had served with Baden Powell's South African Constabulary and for the past six years as a Chief Constable in the London Metropolitan Police, was appointed Chief Commandant of Police and Volunteers for both Rhodesias. He reorganised the Northern Rhodesia Police so that in 1914 it consisted of:
 The Military Branch with a hundred men at Livingstone and four other companies of roughly 80 men at Mongu, Kasempa, Kasama and Fort Jameson.
 The District Police, parties of about 10 African police under the native Commissioner at each government station or Boma.
 The Town Police, 10 or 12 British sergeants and constables and 328 African police stationed at the townships on the line of the railway and at Kansanshi, and the Criminal Investigation Department and Fingerprint Bureau under Regimental Sergeant Major Ferguson who attended a six-week fingerprint course at Scotland Yard while on leave. In July 1914 he was joined by Detective Sergeant Kirk from Southern Rhodesia and they were assisted by five African detectives and a clerk.

By 1914 there were Town Police detachments at Livingstone, Ndola, Solwezi, Fort Jameson, Mumbwa, and Broken Hill. Lieutenant Percy Sillitoe in charge at Lusaka was the only commissioned officer employed on civil police duty. Two hundred Boers had settled in the area in 1911 and there was concern about their ability to maintain themselves without breaking the law. Lusaka itself was little more than a cluster of huts. Much of the work of the CID concerned immigration. At the outbreak of World War I they investigated 62 enemy aliens among a white population of about 2,250. Nine were sent to South Africa for internment.

Northern Rhodesia Police 1914 to 1918
During the Great War, Northern Rhodesia had two fronts to defend. On 9 August 1914 three officers and 80 men left Livingstone for Kasama to guard against invasion from German East Africa. The British South Africa Police sent a detachment to guard the Falls Bridge. On 22 September a combined force of BSAP and NRP occupied the German post at Schuckmannsburg in the Caprivi Strip. The District Police were gradually absorbed into the Military. Sillitoe left for the North never to return. Twenty years later as Chief Constable of Glasgow he was to introduce the chequered cap band now worn by police throughout Great Britain.

In the North, German attacks on Abercorn and Fife were repulsed. The NRP with more than a hundred miles of border to defend were reinforced by Belgian led Congolese troops and a company of White volunteers of the Northern Rhodesia Rifles. In mid-1915 the Germans transported reinforcements down Lake Tanganyika to break through at Saisi, but were again repulsed by the NRP and Belgian garrison. At the same time the surrender of German South-West Africa removed the threat from the Caprivi Strip freeing the remainder of the Military Branch of the NRP for service in the North where two newly raised companies of BSAP replaced the Belgians. By March 1916 the Royal Navy had destroyed the German Fleet on Lake Tanganyika. In May 1916 all five NRP companies crossed into German East Africa. Combined with the two BSAP companies, in what was misnamed the Southern Rhodesia Column under Lieutenant Colonel R. E. Murray , played a full part in driving the enemy out of Tanganyika. In December 1917 the NRP troops in the field were reorganised into four double companies as the Northern Rhodesia Police Service Battalion. Meanwhile, the CID and Town Police had kept on with their work back home. They obtained nearly twice as many convictions in 1917 as in 1914.

In 1918 the Service Battalion joined the chase of the German forces through Mozambique. When they doubled back into Tanganyika the NRP engaged them at Fusi and repulsed an attack on Fife after which 'B' Company accompanied a King's African Rifles battalion which took up the chase back through Northern Rhodesia to Kasama where news of the Armistice was received. The Service Battalion was present at the formal surrender of the German forces at Abercorn on 25 November 1918.

The end of the war saw disturbances in the Fife District caused by Watchtower preaching. The Service Battalion was well positioned to give assistance. Largely due to the work of Detective Robert Simpelwe, 138 persons were arrested leading to convictions in the High Court at Kasama. The CID obtained a warrant under wartime regulations to censor mail and telegrams. A Nyasa telegraphist at Ndola was identified as spreading Watchtower propaganda.

In 1919 a 16-year-old White youth shot an African on a farm in the Lusaka District. He was convicted of manslaughter and sentenced to eight strokes of the cane. Consequently, under the Reformatories, Prisons and Juvenile Offenders Proclamation of 1921 arrangements were made for such offenders to be sent to suitable institutions outside Northern Rhodesia.

Colonel Hodson retired in 1919 and his Second-in-Command, Lt.-Col. H. M. Stennett , became Commandant. In 1922 Major General Sir Alfred Edwards  stood down as Commandant General of Rhodesian Forces and was not replaced. Chief command of all police and military forces in the Territory now rested with the Commandant of the NRP.

In 1923 an African Post Office foreman at Lusaka was sentenced to nine months imprisonment for Larceny by Public Servant for the theft of four postal orders to the value of £1 2s 3d. They were traced to a mail order firm in Bristol, England, where the assistance of the local CID was obtained.

On 1 April 1924 the Administration of Northern Rhodesia became the direct responsibility of the Colonial Office. The NRP then consisted of:
 Headquarters – five officers and four British Other Ranks.
 Military Branch – ten Officers, five British NCOs and 459 Africans.
 Town & District Police – two Officers, 19 British NCOs and constables, and 133 African other ranks.
 CID – One officer, three British NCOs and 21 African detectives.

Colonel Stennett was succeeded as Commandant by Lt-.Col. Arthur Stephenson . Although he had no previous police experience, Stephenson was no stranger to Northern Rhodesia having worked in the postal service and later as a labour recruiter prior to 1914.
 
In May 1926 one hundred men of the Military Branch converged on Serenje to deal with unrest caused by the activities of Tom Nyrenda, Mwanalesa, "The Son of God", a Nyasalander who had worked in the Belgian Congo and at Broken Hill where he was imprisoned for unlawful carnal knowledge of a 13-year-old girl. On his release Tom was baptised by a Watchtower preacher and set himself up as a witch finder. He was convicted of 32 murders, and with two accomplices, one a chief, hanged. 15 other disciples were convicted of murder but their sentences commuted to life imprisonment. Nyrenda was thought to have been responsible for 192 murders in Northern Rhodesia and the Congo.

In 1927 prosecutions rose by 30% due to the development of the Territory and the opening of new police stations. Ten Whites were prosecuted for manslaughter and 65 for other offences. Twenty Africans were prosecuted for murder or manslaughter. In 1928 the first Road Traffic Ordinance came into effect.

Colonel Stephenson retired from the Force in 1930 but continued to serve the Territory as an elected member of the Legislative Council from 1935 and back in uniform as Commander of Northern Rhodesia Area in World War II. Lt.-Col. E. G. Dickinson , who had commanded the Service Battalion in 1918, was the last Commandant before the Military and Civil Police were divided into separate forces on 1 April 1932. The Military Police became the Northern Rhodesia Regiment. The establishment of the new Northern Rhodesia Police was for seven officers, 35 members of the inspectorate, 40 British constables, 494 uniformed African police and 42 African detectives, all under Captain P. R. Wardroper  as Commissioner of Police.

In May 1935 an increase in the annual tax led to unrest among African mineworkers on the Copperbelt. On 29 May a large mob made repeated attacks on the compound office at Roan Antelope which was guarded by less than thirty African police, a number of whom were injured despite wearing miners' helmets as protection against stone throwing. Superintendent Fold was beset by rioters at the rear of the building. The thin line of police in front finally gave way. Inspector Maxwell was hit on the head. While he was seeking permission from Fold to issue ammunition, the African police, in fear for their, lives helped themselves from the box in the office and opened fire. A total of forty rounds were fired and seven rioters killed and 20 wounded before the officers regained control and ordered the men to cease fire. There was then a stand off until troops of the Northern Rhodesia Regiment arrived, having been flown from Lusaka and order was fully restored.

In 1935 Captain Wardroper moved his office to Lusaka, the new capital. In 1936 he retired as Commissioner after 21 years in the Force and was succeeded by his deputy, Harry Hart, who had joined the NRP as a constable in 1919 after war service in the Royal Artillery. In 1937 Detective Constable Ladell investigating a burglary at Victoria Falls took plaster casts of footprints, a recent development in police practice. Ladell followed a spoor for six miles and arrested the two criminals concerned within 24 hours of the commission of the offence. Ladell was promoted to Assistant Inspector Grade II at the end of 1937 when the rank of British Constable was abolished. In October 1938 a Photographic Bureau was established at CID HQ. While on leave Ladell and Assistant Inspector Read attended a forensic science course at the Home Office Laboratory at Nottingham.

Northern Rhodesia Police 1939 to 1964
When war broke out in 1939 the Force comprised eight gazetted officers, 88 inspectors, 542 African police and 32 African detectives. Assistant Inspector F. H. Letchworth died of blackwater fever while guarding the bridge across the Luangwa, having refused to leave his post until relieved. During the War murders averaged 40 a year. An increase in breaking into African housing was put down to the rising cost of living and shortages in the supply of blankets, cooking pots, food and clothing. One European police officer was imprisoned for desertion. He had left to join the armed forces. On release from prison he was directed under the Emergency Powers Regulations to work on the mines. Only 10 of his colleagues were released for military service most of whom were employed in the policing of occupied enemy territory in the Horn of Africa.

In March 1940 a strike by European mineworkers was followed by a walk out by their African co-workers. Since 1935 police detachments of the Copperbelt had been strengthened and steel helmets, wicker shields and tear gas made available. Nevertheless, the available strength was insufficient to repel an attack on the compound offices at Nkhana where troops were almost overrun and shot 17 rioters dead before police reinforcements arrived.

By April 1946 post war recruiting had brought the Force up to a strength of 19 gazetted officers, 83 members of the inspectorate and 793 African police. Hart was succeeded as Commissioner by Colonel J. E. Workman transferred in from Fiji. In 1949 a Mobile Unit was formed at Bwana Mkubwa to form a reserve to deal with riots and internal disturbances. The Unit originally consisted of 100 NCOs and constables rotated from normal station duties; a system of direct recruitment of Africans without the necessary educational qualifications for general police duty was later implemented.

In 1951 Colonel J. P. I. Fforde took over as Commissioner of Police. Fforde had risen from constable to Assistant Inspector-General CID in the Palestine Police before becoming Commissioner in Sierra Leone. He found a force of 47 gazetted officers, 200 inspectors and 1,720 African police in four divisions, manning 32 stations and posts. Fforde was to oversee further expansion. A mounted branch was instituted at Lusaka and the Northern Rhodesia Police Reserve formed from European and African civilians to work part time in support of the regular force.

On 24 October 1953 Northern Rhodesia became part of the ill-fated Federation of Rhodesia and Nyasaland, but the police and courts remained under the Northern Rhodesia Government. Three Platoons of the Northern Rhodesia Police Mobile Unit were sent to Nyasaland on 22 July to assist the Nyasaland Police in dealing with disturbances. On 1 February 1954 a detachment from the Training Depot at Livingstone was sent to Wankie in Southern Rhodesia to assist the BSAP during a strike by mineworkers. In 1955 the Depot closed and a new Police Training School was opened at Lilayi near Lusaka. The first regular women police were recruited.

In January 1955 Harry Nkumbula, President of the Northern Rhodesia African National Congress, and Kenneth Kaunda, the Secretary General, were each sentenced to two months imprisonment for possession of prohibited literature supplied by the Communist Party of Great Britain and other bodies.

That same month a flat was broken into in Kitwe. An impression of the ball of a foot was found on the kitchen windowsill and lifted. Foot impressions were taken from 60 Africans employed locally and the burglar thus identified. He was put on an identification parade and recognised by a miner who had accosted him carrying a bundle on the morning of the crime and from whom he had run away. Northern Rhodesia Police Standing Orders required all identification parades to be photographed, some thirty years before the Code of Practice for the Identification of Persons Suspected of Offences, made under the Police and Criminal Evidence Act 1984 required a similar procedure in England and Wales.

An African set fire to two huts and wounded a boy with an arrow. An African constable sent to arrest him found the man had acquired a muzzle-loading gun. Though unarmed, the constable gave chase only to be shot and seriously wounded. The accused successfully hid in the bush for many weeks until one morning he was found outside Kalulushi police station, sitting at the base of the flagpole with his arms clasped round it.

26 July 1956 saw the first of a series of strikes by African mineworkers on the Copperbelt, accompanied by violence and intimidation. When railway workers joined in and a general strike was threatened a state of emergency was declared in the Western Province. Police detained 77 activists. Troops were called out and detachments of the BSAP and Nyasaland Police arrived to assist in the restoration of order which was complete by 24 September.

In Barotseland towards the end of 1956 two missing African women were found shot in the back. Two brothers were arrested and stated that they had been hired by the deceased's relatives to carry out the killings as the women were believed to be witches responsible for deaths in their villages. Witchcraft paraphernalia was found in the accused's dwellings and a "Kalalozi gun" recovered. Such guns had originally been made of bone. A miloyi or witchdoctor would point his gun at the sun and later at his victim who was supposed to die that night leaving no trace of the cause of death. In later years a metal-barreled model was preferred. After six months of investigations sixteen persons had been convicted or were awaiting trial for a total of eight murders. Eighteen had been convicted or were awaiting trial for attempted murder or conspiracy to murder, and 120 had been convicted of offences against the Witchcraft, Arms & Ammunition and Inquest Ordinances.

At Ndola in 1958 a beer hall and an African-owned tearoom were set on fire, other buildings damaged, motor vehicles attacked and the police stoned. One rioter was shot dead by police and four wounded. 28 persons, mostly members of the African National Congress, were convicted of offences connected with rioting. An order was made under the Riot Damage Ordinance introduced in 1955. The levy imposed on the inhabitants of the area was collected without incident.

Kaunda split with Nkumbula and formed a rival Zambia African National Congress. The ZANC was determined to make a mockery of pending Legislative Council elections, despite an extended franchise. On 11 March 1959 the Governor used the Emergency Powers Ordinance to issue the Safeguard of Elections & Public Safety Regulations 1959. Before dawn on 12 March, Kaunda and 55 of his followers were arrested by police in "Operation Longjump". The elections passed quietly and Harry Nkumbula and five other Africans became members of the Legislative Council. The long-term results were more in Kaunda's favour. ZANC had been banned but was soon to rise again as the United National Independence Party. Kaunda and other leader, rusticated, but well supplied with money, were able to spread the Nationalist word in areas selected by the Government for their previous lack of political awareness. By July the release of those subject to Restriction Orders was well in hand but in June Kaunda was sentenced to nine months' imprisonment for conspiring to effect an unlawful purpose and convening an unlawful assembly, but was released on 9 January 1960.

Uncertainty following the tour of the territory by the Monckton Commission of Inquiry into the future of the Federation and the visit of the Secretary of State for the Colonies, Iain Macleod, led to an increase in politically motivated violence and intimidation. At Ndola on 8 May 1960 police dispersed an unauthorised public meeting and made 127 arrests in dealing with subsequent disorder. Mrs Lillian Burton was driving her daughters home when she was forced to stop by a mob. The windows of her car were smashed and petrol splashed over her and ignited. Her spaniel was burnt alive, but Mrs Burton and her daughters, aged 12 and 5, escaped from the car to be brutally assaulted. They were found by a Forest Ranger and taken to hospital where Mrs Burton died. The officer leading the investigation recorded, "Never during my twenty-seven years police career in Africa have I experienced such profound fear as prevailed in witnesses' minds during this investigation". One witness was found in Southern Rhodesia and an aircraft of the Police Reserve Flight used to intercept a bus on the Tanganyika border. Twenty-two witnesses with their families were housed under police guard. Four hundred statements were recorded and cross checked. At 3am on 28 May, fourteen suspects were arrested in a concerted operation. Identification parades were held at which the witnesses were hooded. Disproving an alibi required a visit to the Congo and the co-operation of the Katanga Police. Four men were charged with murder. For the reassurance of witnesses the Preliminary Inquiry was adjourned to Solwezi 300 miles away, requiring a major logistic and security operation. On 17 August the trial opened at Ndola before Mr Justice Somerhough and four assessors. All four accused were legally represented. On 26 September, after 11,605 pages of evidence had been recorded from 61 witnesses, prosecuting counsel had to withdraw through illness. Before he could be replaced, Mr Justice Somerhough died. A new trial opened on 8 November. Due to the situation in the Congo the attendance of five witnesses from Katanga could not be secured, but statutory provisions enabled their evidence recorded at the aborted trial to be placed before the Court. All four accused were convicted. In July 1961 their appeals to the Federal Supreme Court were dismissed. Their petitions to appeal to the Privy Council were rejected and they were hanged.

In August 1961 G. Mennen Williams, United States Assistant Secretary of State for African Affairs under President John F. Kennedy, visited Northern Rhodesia. The Governor, Sir Evelyn Hone, was at Lusaka airport to bid him farewell when a European resident left the airport bar, strode across the tarmac and punched the American. Williams was back in America when the case came up in Lusaka Magistrate's Court. The Governor, as the Queen's representative, was constitutionally disqualified from giving evidence, but his ADC, Senior Inspector Hawkins, was under no such disability. The accused was convicted and fined £50, then a substantial sum.

Discontent over a new constitution led to disturbances inspired by the United National Independence Party (UNIP) centred on the Northern and Luapula provinces where schools and bridges were destroyed and 27 people killed. 2,691 persons were convicted of as a result of this disorder.

In December 1962 Mr Fforde left on retirement. His successor was Eric Halse  who had joined the NRP as a constable in 1931 and transferred to the British Somaliland Police becoming Commissioner of Police there until returning to the NRP as Fforde's Deputy Commissioner in 1952. The force now consisted of 133 gazetted officers; 788 inspectors, European and African; and 5,126 of other ranks.

On 31 December 1963 Federation came to an end. Kenneth Kaunda became Prime Minister of Northern Rhodesia after elections in January 1964. Accelerated promotion for Africans was facilitated by a scheme of retirement benefits for expatriates which came into effect on 1 May 1964. Mr Halse and his Deputy retired and Lawson Hicks, who had joined the NRP in 1939 after service in the London Metropolitan Police, became the last Commissioner of the NRP. The last months of colonial administration were marred by the worst violence the territory had seen. Alice Lenshina's followers of the Lumpa Church had always refused to join political parties. This led to friction with UNIP supporters. Fearful of their future under the new regime, Lenshina's followers in the Chinsali District rose up in late June. The rising spread to the Lundazi District and although Lenshina surrendered on 11 August, it continued into October. Four members of the NRP were killed and seven wounded. Six soldiers and 185 civilians were also killed by rebels while 472 Lumpas were killed in desperate assaults on the security forces and 46 were killed by other civilians.

On 24 October 1964, Northern Rhodesia became the Republic of Zambia and the Northern Rhodesia Police became the Zambia Police Service. Lawson Hicks, the last Commissioner of the NRP, became the first Commissioner of the Zambia Police Service until succeeded by Michael Mataka who had joined the NRP as a constable in 1941.

References 
 

Police
Law enforcement agencies in Africa
Military units and formations of Rhodesia in World War I